Guimarães is a city and municipality located in northern Portugal, in the district of Braga. 
Its historic town centre has been listed as a UNESCO World Heritage Site since 2001, in recognition for being an "exceptionally well-preserved and authentic example of the evolution of a medieval settlement into a modern town" in Europe.

Guimarães is also a part of the Ave Subregion (one of the most industrialised subregions in the country), as well as the historical Minho Province. The current Mayor is Domingos Bragança, of the Socialist Party. Guimarães, along with Maribor, Slovenia, was the European Capital of Culture in 2012.

The city was settled in the 9th century, at which time it was called Vimaranes. This denomination might have had its origin in the warrior Vímara Peres, who chose this area as the main government seat for the County of Portugal which he conquered for the Kingdom of Galicia. Guimarães has a significant historical importance due to the role it played in the foundation of Portugal. The city is often referred to as the "birthplace of Portugal" or "the cradle city" (Cidade Berço in Portuguese) because it is widely believed that Portugal's first King, Afonso Henriques, was born there, and also due to the fact that the Battle of São Mamede – which is considered the seminal event for the foundation of the Kingdom of Portugal – was fought in the vicinity of the city.

History

 
The History of Guimarães is associated with the foundation and identity of the Portuguese nationality. Guimarães, as well as other settlements, precedes the foundation of Portugal and because of its role in the foundation of the country it is known as the "cradle of the Portuguese nationality". In 1128, major political and military events that would lead to the independence and the birth of a new nation took place in Guimarães. For this reason, in one of the old towers of the city's old wall it is written "Aqui nasceu Portugal" (Portugal was born here).

Ancient history
According to archeological findings in Citânia (Castro) of Briteiros and Sabroso and Penha's archeologic site, the area in which Guimarães is located has had permanent settlements since the late Chalcolithic period.

There is also evidence of Roman occupation, and a stone dedicated to the Roman emperor Trajan found in Caldas das Taipas suggests that this was already a spa town in Roman times.

Foundation

Following the Reconquista policy promoted by the Kingdom of Galicia in the 9th century, the medieval foundations of the actual city have roots in the 10th century. At this point, the Countess Mumadona Dias, erected a monastery in her property of Vimaranes, which originated the fixation of people in the area known as "vila baixa" (downtown). At the same time, she ordered the construction of a castle on the hill area which became known as "vila alta" (uptown), to defend the settlement. To connect these to other areas, the Rua de Santa Maria was built.

The monastery became the "Real Colegiada" (Royal Collegiate church) and throughout time acquired importance due to the privileges and donations given to it by nobles and kings and it became a famous pilgrimage site.

Henry, Count of Portugal approved the first national foral possibly in 1096 (but not confirmed). The foral proves the growing importance of the village of Guimarães at that time, which was chosen as the capital of the County of Portugal.

On 24 June 1128, the "Batalha de São Mamede" (Battle of São Mamede) took place in Guimarães.

Middle Ages
During the reign of king Denis, as the town was expanding, it was partially surrounded by a defensive wall. Meanwhile, mendicant orders settled in Guimarães and helped to mold the shape of the emerging city. Later, during the reign of John I, the wall was torn down and the two parts of the city (uptown and downtown) were finally united and the city began to expand outside its old walls.

The construction of St. Peter's Basilica began in 1737, and became a minor basilica in 1751, with formal completion of the work between 1883 and 1884.

Modern history
Until the 19th century the structure of the city did not suffer many transformations besides the construction of a few more churches, convents and palaces. It was by the ending of the 19th century that new urbanistic ideas of hygiene and symmetry that the village, that was promoted to city by the Queen Maria II on 23 June 1853 had its greatest changes.

The complete demolition of the city walls was authorized and the creation of many streets and avenues could start at that point. The controlled process of urbanization permitted the conservation of the city's magnificent historical center.

Geography

Geology
Granite rock formations occupy the majority of the municipality but schist rocks can also be found in certain zones in the northwest of the municipality. On the southeast, clay can be found in stream bed of the Ave, Vizela and Selho rivers.

Orography and hydrography
The municipality is delimited at north by the "Senhora do Monte" (Senhora hill), at northwest by the hills of Falperra, Sameiro, Outeiro and Penedice. To the south by the Penha hill which with height of 613 meters, it is the highest point of the municipality.

Guimarães is part of the drainage basin of Ave river which divides the municipality in half. The Ave river has as tributaries the Vizela river, Torto river, Febras river and inside the city, the Selho river, the Couros river and the Santa Lúzia stream.

Climate
Guimarães is located in a valley and surrounded by hills, and because it is some distance from the sea, the winter is normally cold and rainy and the summer is hot and lightly humid. The average annual temperature is 14 °C.

Fauna
There is not much diversity, especially in the urban areas, but the municipality has some species of cynegetic interest such as: the red fox, the wild boar, the turtle dove, the thrush, the pigeon and the red-legged partridge. In the green areas of the city, the most common species are rodents, especially squirrels.

Parishes
Administratively, the municipality is divided into 48 civil parishes (freguesias):

Abação e Gémeos
Airão Santa Maria, Airão São João e Vermil
Aldão
Arosa e Castelões
Atães e Rendufe
Azurém
Barco
Briteiros Salvador e Briteiros Santa Leocádia
Briteiros Santo Estêvão e Donim
Brito
Caldas das Taipas (Caldelas)
Candoso (São Martinho)
Candoso São Tiago e Mascotelos
Conde e Gandarela
Costa
Creixomil
Fermentões
Gonça
Gondar
Guardizela
Infantas
Leitões, Oleiros e Figueiredo
Longos
Lordelo
Mesão Frio
Moreira de Cónegos
Nespereira
Oliveira, São Paio e São Sebastião
Pencelo
Pinheiro
Polvoreira
Ponte
Prazins (Santa Eufémia)
Prazins Santo Tirso e Corvite
Ronfe
Sande São Lourenço e Balazar
Sande (São Martinho)
Sande Vila Nova e Sande São Clemente
São Torcato
Selho (São Cristóvão)
Selho (São Jorge)
Selho São Lourenço e Gominhães
Serzedelo
Serzedo e Calvos
Silvares
Souto Santa Maria, Souto São Salvador e Gondomar
Tabuadelo e São Faustino
Urgezes

Demographics

In 2001, the population of the municipality was 159 576. In 2010, it is estimated that the population will reach 188 178 inhabitants.
The population is constituted by 78 436 males and 81 140 females. Guimarães is the 13th biggest city in the country in terms of population.

 Evolution of the population of the municipality of Guimarães (1801–2011)

 Evolution of the population in the city center (1864–2011)

Culture

Guimarães is an average size city but with a booming cultural life. Besides its museums, monuments, cultural associations, art galleries and popular festivities, it has since September 2005, an important cultural space, the Vila Flor Cultural Center. This cultural center has two auditoria, exhibition center and a concert-cafe. Guimarães was the European Capital of Culture in 2012, together with Maribor in Slovenia.

Guimarães is also home to association football club Vitória S.C. who compete in the Primeira Liga, the top-flight of football in Portugal.

Guimarães was elected by The New York Times one of the 41 places to go in 2011 and called it one of the Iberian peninsula's emerging cultural spots.

Cuisine
The fact that Guimarães was founded on the lands of a female convent had a great influence on the region's cuisine, especially its confectionery, such as the "Tortas de Guimarães" (Guimarães' tarts, a half moon flakey pastry wrongfully named a tart) and, mainly, the "Toucinho do céu" (normally, but incorrectly, translated as bacon from heaven, a moist yellow-colored pudding-cake). Besides what is usual in Minho, such as "vinho verde" , "Papas de sarrabulho" (a pig meat and blood porridge), "Rojões" (stewed pig meat served with potatoes and entrail sausage), etc., the so-called "Bôla de carne" (Meat cakes) is also made here, consisting of a type of bread (shaped like a pizza) served with toucinho (bacon), sardines or other toppings.

Traditions and festivities
"Festas Gualterianas" (Gualteriana festival), in honor of São Gualter (Saint Walter, a minor franciscan friar), take place since 1906 in the first weekend of August. The "Cortejo do Linho" (Linen parade) and the "Batalha das Flores" (Battle of the Flowers) are part of the festivities which are ended by the "Marcha Gualteriana" (Gualteriana march).
"Nicolinas" are the festivities of the students of Guimarães, celebrated in honor of Saint Nicholas. The festivities start on the 29th of November and finish on the 7th of December. They are composed of different celebrations; the "Pinheiro" celebration being the most widely attended: after the "Ceia Nicolina" (Nicolina dinner), the participants parade the streets of Guimarães playing the "Toques Nicolinos" tune on drums while, traditionally, o Pinheiro (Pine/Christmas tree) is pulled in carts by bulls. Lately, it has been suggested that the "Nicolinas" should be a contender to be UNESCO intangible cultural heritage.
The "Santa Luzia" festivities in honor of Saint Lucy take place annually on 13 December, near to the chapel of Santa Luzia. One of the traditions of these festivities is the selling of traditional cakes made of rye flour and sugar, called "Sardão" and "Passarinha" (these names have sexual connotations in Portuguese, associated to male and female genitalia respectively). According to the tradition, a boy should offer a "Sardão", which has a phallic form, to the girl and if the girl was interested in dating the boy, she should reply by gifting him with a "Passarinha".
The "Romaria Grande de São Torcato" (São Torcato Big pilgrimage) is one of the biggest romarias in Minho, takes place annually in July in the village of São Torcato.

Museums, cultural spaces and art galleries

The city of Guimarães has several cultural spaces of reference at a regional and national level. Among the several museums of the city, the Alberto Sampaio museum is the one that stands out. Founded in 1928, it opened its doors to the public in 1931; it is located in the old site of the Canon the Collegiate of Our Lady of Oliveira (Cabido da Colegiada de Nossa Senhora da Oliveira in Portuguese). It contains a rich collection of pieces from the 14th, 15th and 16th century, including one rare vest that was used by the king John I.

The Martins Sarmento Society (Sociedade Martins Sarmento in Portuguese) is one of the country oldest institutions dedicated to the study and preservation of archaeological artifacts. The society owns two museums: the Archaeological Museum of the Martins Sarmento Society, which is known by its prehistory and protohistory collections and also its numismatics and epigraphy collections; and the Castro Culture Museum which is dedicated to the Castro culture.

There is also: the Primitive Modern Arts Museum, located in the Domus Municipalis (the old city hall), which contains a collection of naïve art; the Museum of the Village of São Torcato, which is dedicated to the region and its relationship with the monastery and Saint Torcato (São Torcato in Portuguese); the Agriculture Museum of Fermentões, which exhibits collections of the traditional agricultural practices of the region; and the Museum of São Sebastião, inaugurated on 24 March 1984, which contains mainly sacred art.

Other cultural venues include:
Vila Flor Cultural Center (Centro Cultural Vila Flor in Portuguese) is the main cultural venue in Guimarães. It was built in 2005, in a recovery of the old Vila Flor Palace and its surrounding area. It has two auditoriums, a concert-cafe and an exhibition gallery. The surrounding gardens of the old palace were also redone and in 2006, received an honorable mention in the Public Exterior Spaces category in the National Landscape Architecture Award.
São Mamede – Guimarães Arts and Shows Center
Raul Brandão Municipal Library has its headquarters in the city and also has branches in Pevidém, Caldas das Taipas and Ronfe. It offers its mobile library services to 42 parishes and services the city schools and prison.
The Art Laboratory (Laboratorio das Artes in Portuguese) was founded in 2004 by ESAP students. It is a cultural space for exhibitions, performances, music and art workshops.
Alfredo Pimenta National Archive, founded in 1931, contains the archives for municipality of Guimarães and also the Braga district.

Sports

Guimarães has two major sports club, Vitória Sport Clube, whose football (soccer) team has been the city's representative in the Primeira Liga every year, having already conquered a Portuguese Cup in 2012/13 and a Portuguese Supercup in 1988, and Moreirense Futebol Clube, whose football (soccer) team is also in Primeira Liga for some years and already won the Portuguese Second Division in 2013/14 and the Portuguese League Cup in 2016/17. 
During Vitória SC European campaigns, the Portuguese team played against teams like Arsenal FC, Atletico Madrid, Real Sociedad, Eintracht Frankfurt, Parma FC and Borussia Monchengladbach.

Vitória SC also has basketball, volleyball and water polo squads competing in the top divisions of their sports.

Society

In 2008, the city ranked second in the index of most livable city in Portugal. It is also the second most polluted city in the country.

In 2004, 89% of the population had running water; it was forecast that the number would raise to 95% by 2006. In 2001, 63.5% of the population had basic sanitation; it was forecast that the number would raise to 80% by 2008. In 2001, 100% of the population had access to waste management services.

However, several people complain that the city, together with other cities of the Braga district has had an unaesthetic and unorganized growth.

Newspapers
Guimarães ranks fourth in the country for available newspapers. The oldest was the "Azemel Vimaranense", founded in 1822; it possibly had its publication halted by the Vilafrancada incidents. From 1856, other newspapers start to appear, amongst them "A Tesoura de Guimarães". Actually the city's newspapers are:

O Comércio de Guimarães
O Cónego
O Conquistador
Desportivo de Guimarães
Entrevillas
O Expresso do Ave
Jornal do Adepto
Lordelo Jornal
Notícias de Guimarães
O Pilar
O Povo de Guimarães
Reflexo – O Espelho das Taipas
Sport Jornal dos Desportos

Radios

There are two stations headquartered in the town: Radio Fundação (95.8 FM) and Radio Santiago (98.0 FM).

Television

The Guimarães TV transmission is made online since 24 July 2007; it is the result of a collaboration between the city's assembly and the Guimarães Cybercenter. Its contents are feature in the Região Norte TV channel which is available through cable.

The "canalguimarães" was another online channel that started operating in March 2010. It is the fruit of the effort put in by an arts association, the "Associação de Socorros Mútuos Artística Vimaranense", one of the oldest associations of the city.

Economy
Guimarães is one of the most industrial municipalities in Portugal. Its primary industries are textiles, shoe industry and metalomechanics.

Transport

Guimarães is linked to Porto by the Guimarães line. This railway line was originally built with narrow gauge track, then modernised and rebuilt to the broad Iberian gauge in the first decade of the 21st century. The train service is operated by Comboios de Portugal (CP). Locally, Guimarães is served by TUG (Transportes Urbanos de Guimarães) which operates 21 bus routes serving the city.

Twin towns – sister cities

Guimarães is twinned with:

 Brive-la-Gaillarde, France
 Colonia del Sacramento, Uruguay
 Compiègne, France
 Dijon, France
 Igualada, Spain
 Kaiserslautern, Germany
 Lisbon, Portugal
 Londrina, Brazil
 Mé-Zóchi, São Tomé and Príncipe
 Montluçon, France
 Ribeira Grande de Santiago, Cape Verde
 Rio de Janeiro, Brazil
 Tacoronte, Spain

Notable people

Medieval and Early Modern
Urraca Henriques (1095-1173) noble person and daughter of Teresa de Leão and sister of Afonso I
Afonso I of Portugal (1111–1185) nicknamed "the Conqueror" by the Moors, whom he fought, was the first King of Portugal
Paio Galvão (c. 1165–1230) a Leonese Cardinal, canon lawyer, a papal legate and leader of the Fifth Crusade
Blanche of Portugal (1259–1321) an infanta, the firstborn child of King Afonso III of Portugal
Gil Vicente (c. 1465–ca.1536) a playwright and poet, acted and directed his own plays
Agostinho Barbosa (1589–1649) a writer on canon law, consecrated Bishop of Ugento in Italy
Catarina de Lencastre, Viscountess of Balsemão (1749—1824) a noblewoman, poet and playwright.

Late Modern

António Augusto da Silva Cardoso (1831-1893) a Portuguese painter
Alberto Sampaio (1841-1908) an historian, writer, archaeologist and teacher
Vicente Pinheiro Lobo Machado de Melo e Almada (1852-1922) a politician, diplomat, congressperson and colonial administrator
João Gomes de Oliveira Guimarães (1853-1912) a politician, historian and catholic priest
Abel Cardoso (1877-1964) a painter, and son of António Augusto da Silva Cardoso
Alfredo Pimenta (1882–1950) an historian, poet and writer about the Middle Ages
Abel Salazar (1889–1946) a physician, lecturer, researcher, writer and painter
Emídio Guerreiro (1899-2005) a teacher, politician and opponent of the Estado Novo
Arnaldo Sampaio (1908-1984) a doctor, receiver of the Grã-Cruz da Ordem do Mérito medal
Duarte Freitas do Amaral (1909–1979) a Portuguese politician, was a Deputy to the National Assembly of Portugal
Mário António Caldas de Melo Saraiva (1910-1998) historian, doctor, politician and writer
Alberto Martins (born 1945) a lawyer, politician and congressperson
Luís Marques Mendes (born 1957) a Portuguese lawyer and politician
Elisabete Matos (born 1964) a Portuguese soprano.
Pedro Chagas Freitas (born 1979) writer, journalist and public speaker on leadership issues
Marisa Ferreira (born 1983) an artist whose work includes public art and geometric art
Sofia Escobar (born 1984) a soprano singer and actress in London's West End musicals.
Renato Freitas (born 1991) stage name Lizzy's Husband an electronic music artist especially industrial electronica

Sports

Francisco "Xico" Ferreira (1919–1986) a footballer with 178 club caps and 25 with Portugal
Aurora Cunha (born 1959) a former athlete
Horácio Gonçalves (born 1962) a retired footballer with 284 club caps and currently a manager.
Domingos Castro (born 1963) a former long-distance runner, competed in the 1988, 1992, 1996 and 2000 Summer Olympics
Dionísio Castro (born 1963) a former long-distance runner, he competed at the 1988 and 1992 Summer Olympics
Miguel Marques (born 1963) a retired footballer with 545 club caps
Quim Berto (born 1971) a former professional footballer with 451 club caps
Fernando Meira (born 1978) a footballer with 534 club caps and 54 with Portugal
Pedro Mendes (born 1979) a footballer with 298 club caps and 11 with Portugal
Domingos Alexandre Martins Costa (born 1979) known as Alex, is a former footballer with 295 club caps
Rui Faria (born 1980) known as Faria, is a football goalkeeper with 270 club caps
Ricardo (born 1980) a Cape Verdean footballer with 469 club caps and 16 with Cape Verde
Vítor Lima (born 1981) a retired footballer with 479 club caps
Carlos Carneiro (born 1982) a former Portuguese handballer.
Ana Dulce Félix (born 1982) a long-distance runner, competed in the 2012 and 2016 Summer Olympics
Custódio Castro (born 1983) known as Custódio, a retired footballer with 342 club caps and 10 with Portugal
Vieirinha (born 1986) a footballer with over 400 club caps and 25 with Portugal
Márcio Sousa (born 1986) a professional footballer with over 350 club caps
João Sousa (born 1989) Portugal's greatest tennis player, ranked 36th by the ATP
Rui Bragança (born 1991) a Portuguese taekwondo practitioner

See also

References

External links

Municipality official website
Tourism in Guimarães
Photos from Guimarães
Guimarães 2012
Guimarães 2012 – Cultural Programme on e-book format
"Guimarães: 2012 European Capital of Culture – Portugal", Portuguese American Journal

 
Cities in Portugal
World Heritage Sites in Portugal